The Ontario and Rainy River Railway was a railway that existed briefly in the late 19th century. The company had been incorporated in 1886 to build a railway from Port Arthur, Ontario to the Rainy River. On the 4th of May 1899, the chief promoters of the Canadian Northern Railway Mackenzie and Mann had announced they had acquired the railway charter. Construction of the line began at Stanley, Ontario on 1 August 1898. 

The rail line ran from Stanley, Ontario to Rainy River, Ontario with eventual plans to connect to Port Arthur in the East, and to the Manitoba and Southeastern Railway, via a new Steel bridge at Rainy River.  After the Baudette-Rainy River Rail Bridge was completed in 1901, the company was quickly absorbed by the Canadian Northern Railway,  which built a roundhouse, a bunkhouse (to house train crews between shifts), a hotel and several other pieces of equipment at the town. It was taken over and absorbed by the Canadian National Railway in 1923, and still operates as an active rail line.

Stations

 Atikokan, Ontario: demolished and replaced by CNR station in 1923
 Rainy River, Ontario: now 201 Atwood Avenue (Highway #11) and 4th Street (next to Ontario Travel office) and now used as Rainy River Municipal offices and seniors centre
 Stratton, Ontario: moved to end of Theker Street and current vacant
 Barwick, Ontario: moved to Lake Road and currently vacant
 Fort Frances, Ontario: now at 140 Fourth Street West at Cornwall Avenue and used as office space and community use (Fort Frances Volunteer Bureau, local MP office, etc...)
 Thunder Bay, Ontario: now 2212 Sleeping Giant Parkway near North Water Street and used as commercial and offices

See also

 List of Ontario railways
 List of defunct Canadian railways

References

Defunct Ontario railways
Predecessors of the Canadian Northern Railway
Rail transport in Rainy River District
Canadian companies established in 1896
Railway companies established in 1896
Railway companies disestablished in 1923